Serbinai (formerly) is a village in Kėdainiai district municipality, in Kaunas County, in central Lithuania. According to the 2011 census, the village had a population of 40 people. There is a grain elevator.

History

In the beginning of the 20th century Serbinai was an estate of the Miłosz (Milošai) family.

Demography

References

Villages in Kaunas County
Kėdainiai District Municipality